The New York State College of Human Ecology at Cornell University (HumEc) is a statutory college and one of four New York State contract colleges located on the Cornell University campus in Ithaca, New York. The College of Human Ecology is compilation of study areas such as design, design thinking, consumer science, nutrition, health economics, public policy, human development and textiles, each through the perspective of human ecology.

The school was founded in 1925 as the New York State College of Home Economics, growing out of an academic department that had been started in 1907. The college was renamed to its present appelation in 1969. 

The college is open to both New York State residents and to non-residents; residents pay reduced tuition rates. In 2007-2008, the HumEc total budget of $42 million included $33 million in tuition revenue and $9 million in state appropriations.

Academics
The College enrolls approximately 1,250 undergraduates and 458 graduate students, and has approximately 105 professors and lecturers, and 70 research associates. Human Ecology provides a liberal arts foundation supporting career-specific preparation in a small college environment. The admitted freshman profile is in the middle 50th percentile. In 2005, the Cornell Alumni Magazine reported males represented 25 percent of College of Human Ecology 2005–06 student body.

The five academic departments comprising the College are Design and Environmental Analysis, Fiber Science & Apparel Design, Human Development, Policy Analysis and Management, and Nutritional Sciences, which offer the following undergraduate majors: Design and Environmental Analysis; Fiber Science and Apparel Design, with possible options in Apparel Design, Fashion Design Management, or Fiber Science; Global and Public Health Sciences; Human Biology; Health and Society; Human Development; Nutritional Sciences; Policy Analysis and Management; and Healthcare Policy. Thirty-five to forty percent of Human Ecology students continue in professional or graduate degree programs following the completion of undergraduate degree programs. The college also houses the Cornell Institute for Public Affairs (CIPA), which awards the Master of Public Administration degree and the Sloan Program Master of Health Administration.

History

The home economics movement emerged toward the end of the nineteenth century. Pioneers such as Ellen Swallow Richards and Mr. and Mrs. Melvil Dewey championed home economics as a field in higher education.

From 1903 to 1907 Martha Van Rensselaer (1864–1932), a pioneer in the field of home economics, and American nutritionist Flora Rose (1874-1959), and Anna Botsford Comstock taught early home economics courses at the New York State College of Agriculture. and later co-directed the fledgling department of Home Economics. In 1914, the United States Congress passed the Smith-Lever Act to establish a system of cooperative extension services provided by land-grant universities for the purpose of educating American farmers, youth, and other groups about developments in the fields of agriculture, home economics, 4-H and other related domains.  Van Rensselaer and Rose advocated for the state charter of 1925 for the New York State College of Home Economics - the first unit of its kind in the United States.

In 1929, Eleanor Roosevelt lent political influence to assist the college to obtain public funds to construct a building, later completed in 1933. 

In 1969, the College was renamed the New York State College of Human Ecology. The term human ecology refers to methods regarding the study of relationships between people and natural and constructed environments.

Requests for appropriations, budgets, estimates, and expenditures has remained under the management and control of the State University of New York, and the college is therefore subject to the financial supervision of the SUNY trustees. In this respect, the college is fundamentally a part of Cornell's land-grant mandate of providing state funds for training in "practical" fields that assist the economy of the state.

Facilities
In 1933, the College was housed in Martha Van Rensselaer Hall (MVR), located at 116 Reservoir Avenue in Ithaca. The Georgian Revival style brick building was designed by architect William Haugaard of the New York State Dormitory Authority. 

In 1968, architect Ulrich Franzen designed an addition on the north side MVR Hall. The expansion provided studio and laboratory space for faculty and students. In 2003,  Dean Patsy Brannon presided over the completion of a west wing addition to MVR Hall, providing space for the Division of Nutritional Sciences, including a human metabolic research unit as well as an interactive distance-learning classroom. 

Meanwhile, MVR Hall's north wing had been urgently evacuated in 2001 due to structural problems, and was demolished in 2005. In 2011, a new 89,000-square foot facility designed by Gruzen Samton and IBI Group was completed to provide a parking garage, a three-story building, and a commons adjacent to the existing building. In 2015, the Green Parking Council certified the parking structure a green garage.

Notable alumni
 Sandra Fluke - attorney, political candidate and activist.
 Mark Whitacre - American business executive who acted as an informant for the FBI to investigate price-fixing at Archer Daniels Midland.
 James Pitaro - Chairman, ESPN and Sports Content at The Walt Disney Company.

Notable faculty
Urie Bronfenbrenner
Joan Jacobs Brumberg
Stephen Ceci
Karl Pillemer
Robert Sternberg
Susan Margaret Watkins
Ritch Savin-Williams

Further reading
 New York State College of Human Ecology. (2000). Human ecology. Ithaca, NY 
 New York State College of Human Ecology & Herbert F. Johnson Museum of Art. (1991). American clothing: Identity in mass culture, 1840 to 1990. Ithaca, NY: New York State College of Human Ecology.
 New York State College of Human Ecology. (1989). Report of the New York State College of Human Ecology. Ithaca, N.Y: The University.
 New York State College of Human Ecology. (1984). Some ways to find out about child abuse and neglect, child welfare, adoption of children with special needs, troubled adolescents. Ithaca, N.Y: Family Life Development Center, Region II Resource Center on Children and Youth, Cornell University.
 New York State College of Human Ecology. (1981). Television advertising for children: Buy it or ban it?. Ithaca, N.Y: Television, Radio, and Film.
 New York State College of Human Ecology. (1970). Annual report of the New York State College of Human Ecology. Ithaca, N.Y: The College.
 New York State College of Human Ecology. (1978). Expanding adolescent role expectations: information, activities, resources for vocational educators. Ithaca, N.Y: The College.
 New York State College of Human Ecology at Cornell University. (1999). Human ecology historical photographs. Ithaca, N.Y: College of Human Ecology.

References

External links
 

Colleges and schools of Cornell University
State University of New York statutory colleges
1925 establishments in New York (state)
Specialized doctoral-granting institutions in New York (state)